The Brihanmumbai Municipal Corporation (BMC;), also known as the Municipal Corporation of Greater Mumbai (MCGM), is the governing civic body of Mumbai, the capital city of Maharashtra. It is India's richest municipal corporation. The BMC's annual budget exceeds that of some of India's smaller states. It was established under the Bombay Municipal Corporation Act 1888. BMC is responsible for the civic infrastructure and administration of the city and some suburbs. Brihanmumbai Municipal Corporation has been formed with functions to improve the infrastructure of town.



Administration
The BMC is headed by an IAS officer who serves as Municipal Commissioner, wielding executive power. A quinquennial election is held to elect corporators, who are responsible for basic civic infrastructure and enforcing duty. The Mayor, usually from the majority party, serves as head of the house. As of June 2008, all administrative business in the BMC was conducted in Marathi, a decision that sparked controversy, following which the BMC eased its stance and began accepting forms in English.

Legislature
As of 2017, the BMC's legislature, also known as the Corporation Council, consisted of 227 members. 2017 was the first time 31 candidates contested from a single ward (164). Raghvendra Singh was the youngest independent candidate at age 21. BMC is one of the richest municipal corporations in Asia.

Revenue sources 

The following are the Income sources for the Corporation from the Central and State Government.

Revenue from taxes  
Following is the Tax related revenue for the corporation.

 Property tax.
 Profession tax.
 Entertainment tax.
 Grants from Central and State Government like Goods and Services Tax.
 Advertisement tax.

Revenue from non-tax sources 

Following is the Non Tax related revenue for the corporation.

 Water usage charges.
 Fees from Documentation services.
 Rent received from municipal property.
 Funds from municipal bonds.

References

 
Municipal corporations in Maharashtra
1888 establishments in India
Government agencies established in 1888
Government of Mumbai